McClements is a surname. Notable people with the surname include:

Stuart McClements (born 1960)
Scotland
Catherine McClements (born 1965), Australian actress
Dave McClements (born 1989), Northern Irish footballer, who plays in midfield
Dorothy McClements (born 1944), American gymnast
Josephine McClements, former camogie player, winner of the Gradam Tailte award
Les McClements, Australian rules footballer
Lyn McClements (born 1951), Australian butterfly swimmer and Olympic gold medallist

See also
McClement